Chaetostoma guairense is a species of catfish in the family Loricariidae. It is a freshwater fish native to South America, where it occurs in the basins of the Tuy River, the Guaire River, and Lake Valencia in Venezuela. The species reaches  SL.

References

guairense
Fish described in 1881
Catfish of South America
Fish of Venezuela